Saint Omer or St Omer most commonly refers to:
 St Omer, the common name of Saint Audomare (died c. 670)

Saint Omer may also refer to:

People  
 Godfrey de Saint-Omer (12th century), one of the 12th century founders of the Knights Templar
Walter of Saint Omer (d. 1174), Prince of Galilee
 Nicholas I of Saint Omer (11??-121?), French knight who participated in the Fourth Crusade and became a lord in the Frankish Duchy of Athens, father of Bela
 Bela of Saint Omer (died 1258), Lord of one half of Thebes, father of Nicholas II, Otho and John
 Nicholas II of Saint Omer (died 1294), Lord of one half of Thebes
 Otho of Saint Omer (died 1299), Lord of one half of Thebes
 John of Saint Omer (13th century), Marshal of Achaea, father of Nicholas III
 Nicholas III of Saint Omer (died 1314), Lord of one half of Thebes and Marshal of Achaea

Places

Canada
Saint-Omer, Quebec, a town in L'Islet Regional County Municipality 
Saint-Omer, Gaspésie–Îles-de-la-Madeleine, Quebec

France
 Saint-Omer, Calvados
 Saint-Omer-en-Chaussée, Oise
 Saint-Omer, Pas-de-Calais

Germany
 St. Omer, a small village in the municipality of Suhlendorf, Germany

United States
 Saint Omer, Indiana

Other 
 Saint Omer (film), 2022 film by Alice Diop
 Sant Omer, a similarly named composer of Trecento music
 College of St. Omer, a Catholic school that operated from about 1594 to 1793
 Battle of Saint-Omer, Hundred Years War, 1340
 Hours of Saint-Omer, illuminated manuscript of 
 Siege of Saint-Omer, Thirty Years War, 1638